The FIS Alpine World Ski Championships 1993 were held 4–14 February in Japan at Shizukuishi ski area, northwest of Morioka, the capital of Iwate Prefecture. The men's Super-G race was cancelled due to persistent bad weather and the title went unassigned.

Men's competitions

Downhill

Date: February 5

Super-G

Unassigned.

Giant Slalom

Date: February 10

Slalom

Date: February 13

Combination

Date: February 8

Women's competitions

Downhill
Date: February 11

Super G

Date: February 14

Giant Slalom

Date: February 10

Slalom

Date: February 9

Combination

Date: February 5

Medals table
References

External links
FIS-ski.com - results - 1993 World Championships - Morioka, Japan
FIS-ski.com - results - World Championships
venue at Google Maps

FIS Alpine World Ski Championships
1993 in Japanese sport
1993
A
Alpine skiing competitions in Japan
February 1993 sports events in Asia
Sports competitions in Iwate Prefecture
Sport in Morioka